The Parliamentary representation by historic counties is summarised in this article, with links to the articles about the representation of each of the historic counties in the House of Commons of the Parliaments of England (to 1707), Great Britain (1707-1800) and the United Kingdom (from 1801).

History of the historic counties and parliament
England was divided into shires during the Anglo-Saxon period, before the Norman conquest in 1066. After the conquest these sub-divisions of the country became known as counties. There were some changes in the number and boundaries of the counties in the 11th to 13th centuries, but by the time the representatives from them (known as Knights of the Shire) were summoned to attend Parliaments from the 13th century, the list of the historic counties was fixed. The two Palatine counties of Cheshire and Durham were not represented until the sixteenth and seventeenth centuries respectively, but the other historic counties each returned two county members.

In addition places (which in theory were urban areas) were created as parliamentary boroughs, from time to time starting in the thirteenth century. A place once enfranchised tended to continue to be required to send members to Parliament (known as burgesses or citizens for cities and barons for the Cinque Ports), even if it always had an insignificant population or decayed over the centuries. Although some boroughs included parts of more than one county it was customary to regard them as being associated with one county for the purpose of parliamentary representation.

The historic counties and the parliamentary boroughs within them (apart from a few boroughs straddling county boundaries which were conventionally associated with one of the historic counties) were considered as distinct communities before 1918. English counties were first divided for parliamentary purposes under the Reform Act 1832, when larger counties were divided into two divisions.  However none of the county divisions crossed the historic county boundaries (except that under the Parliamentary Boundaries Act 1832 detached parts were allocated for parliamentary purposes to the counties in which they were geographically located).

Boundary reviews were considered county by county unless, in the interests of producing more equal constituencies, two or more review areas (administrative counties and county boroughs between the redistributions of 1918 and 1974) were combined for a particular redistribution.

In 1918 Rutland, the smallest of the historic counties was joined with part of another county, but it was rare for an English constituency to cross county or county borough boundaries before the redistribution of 1983, which was based on the altered local government arrangements introduced in 1974. Since then the Boundary Commission for England has more often combined review areas to create cross border constituencies.

Although the historic counties were replaced, for most official purposes, by administrative counties in 1889; these were mostly the historic counties (with some rationalisation of borders) or well established sub-divisions of them. It was not until the local government reforms, in 1965 in the London area and 1974 elsewhere in England, that many administrative boundaries diverged in a major way from those of the historic counties. However, as the historic counties remain the focus of local patriotism it is worth continuing the lists until the present day.

Tables
 (Type of constituency) BC Borough constituency, CC County constituency, UC University constituency.

The historic county of Hampshire (formerly Southamptonshire) is divided between its mainland and Isle of Wight parts. The only overlap is for the two member county constituency before 1832, which is included in the mainland entry. Otherwise the article allocates all constituencies to the historic county they are wholly or predominantly located in. Borough constituencies which were located in counties of themselves, county boroughs or unitary authorities have been allocated to the geographic historic county they were associated with even if they had had no administrative connection for centuries (the City of London and Middlesex for example).

Rutland has not provided the predominant part of any constituency since 1918, but all other historic counties have contained at least one seat until the present.

Table 1: List of historic counties and when they were represented
Note: Dates of representation prior to 1510 are provisional.

Table 2: List of historic counties representation, by constituencies and period

Table 3: List of historic counties representation, by members and period

See also
 Wikipedia:Index of article on UK Parliament constituencies in England
 Wikipedia:Index of articles on UK Parliament constituencies in England N-Z

References
 Boundaries of Parliamentary Constituencies 1885-1972, compiled and edited by F.W.S. Craig (Parliamentary Reference Publications 1972)
 British Parliamentary Constituencies: A Statistical Compendium, by Ivor Crewe and Anthony Fox (Faber and Faber 1984)
 British Parliamentary Election Results 1832-1885, compiled and edited by F.W.S. Craig (The Macmillan Press 1977)
 The House of Commons 1509-1558, by S.T. Bindoff (Secker & Warburg 1982)
 The House of Commons 1558-1603, by P.W. Hasler (HMSO 1981)
 The House of Commons 1660-1690, by Basil Duke Henning (Secker & Warburg 1983)
 The House of Commons 1715-1754, by Romney Sedgwick (HMSO 1970)
 The House of Commons 1754-1790, by Sir Lewis Namier and John Brooke (HMSO 1964)
 The House of Commons 1790-1820, by R.G. Thorne (Secker & Warburg 1986)
 The Parliaments of England by Henry Stooks Smith (1st edition published in three volumes 1844–50), second edition edited (in one volume) by F.W.S. Craig (Political Reference Publications 1973) out of copyright

 
Counties of England